Cyclostrema dunkeri is a species of small sea snail, a marine gastropod mollusk, in the family Liotiidae.

Description
The diameter of the shell attains 2.5 mm. The depressed shell is widely umbilicated, with a spiral rib near the suture, another on the periphery, and a third circumscribing the umbilicus.

Distribution
This marine species occurs off Japan.

References

External links
 To World Register of Marine Species

dunkeri
Gastropods described in 1888